Telemundo 51 may refer to:

 WSCV, Miami, Florida
 KNSO, Fresno, California
 WRIW-CD, Providence, Rhode Island (repeats WYCN-LD)